"Drug Addiction" is a song by American rapper YoungBoy Never Broke Again, released on September 11, 2020, as the introductory track from his second studio album, Top. The slow trap beat sees YoungBoy speak about his life struggles and his come up.

Critical reception
AllMusics Fred Thomas noted that "the album starts strong with the pleading melodic autotune." He continues to note that "it's one of several songs where YoungBoy rides plaintive instrumentals with sung/rapped bars about emotional pain and times of struggle."

Charts

Certifications

References

2020 songs
YoungBoy Never Broke Again songs
Songs written by YoungBoy Never Broke Again